Kiki Bertens and Johanna Larsson were the defending champions, but Bertens chose to compete in Brisbane instead and Larsson chose not to participate this year.

Sara Errani and Bibiane Schoofs won the title, defeating Eri Hozumi and Miyu Kato in the final, 7–5, 6–1.

Seeds

Draw

Draw

References
Draw

ASB Classic - Doubles
Women's Doubles